Palair or Paleru is a village in Kusumanchi tehsil, Khammam district, in the state of Telangana, India. It is located on the Khammam to Suryapet road.

Government and politics
At the state level, Palair is a part of Palair (Assembly constituency) of the Telangana Legislative Assembly. As of 2018, it is represented in the assembly by Kandala Upender Reddy of the Indian National Congress.

At the national level, Palair is a part of Khammam (Lok Sabha constituency) of the Lok Sabha. As of 2019, it is represented in the parliament by Nama Nageswara Rao of the Telangana Rashtra Samithi.

References

Villages in Khammam district